A referendum on creating administrative regions was held in Portugal on 8 November 1998. Two proposals were put to voters, the first on implementing the regions, and the second specifically asking whether voters approved of the new region for their area. The proposals were rejected by wide margins by voters.

Political positions
The major parties in Portugal at the time listed with their political positioning and their official answer to the referendum question:

Left
Portuguese Communist Party - YES
Ecologist Party "The Greens" - YES
Socialist Party - YES 
Right
Social Democratic Party - NO
People's Party - NO

Results

Question I

Question II

References

Referendums in Portugal
1998 referendums
1998 in Portugal
November 1998 events in Europe